Kimberly Breier (born September 12, 1972) is an American diplomat, who served as Assistant Secretary of State for Western Hemisphere Affairs from October 15, 2018 until her resignation on August 8, 2019.

Early life
Breier was born in Marblehead, Massachusetts. She completed a bachelor's degree in Spanish at Middlebury College and a master's degree in Latin American studies at the School of Foreign Service of Georgetown University.

Career
Between January 2005 and June 2006, she worked at the White House in the Western Hemisphere Affairs Office of the National Security Council, first as director for Brazil and the Southern Cone, and later as director for Mexico and Canada. She was also interim director for the Andean region.

Under the Trump administration, since 2017, she has been a member of the policymaking team for the Western Hemisphere of the United States Department of State. In March 2018, President Donald Trump nominated her as Assistant Secretary of State for Western Hemisphere Affairs, and was ratified by the United States Senate in October of that year. Breier replaced Francisco Palmieri, who was acting interim since the beginning of Trump's presidency in January 2017.

On January 30, 2019, Breier tweeted support for Canada, following their decision to reduce its embassy staff in Havana, Cuba, after a 14th Canadian diplomat reported symptoms of the mysterious Havana syndrome in late December 2018.

Breier resigned on August 8, 2019, officially for personal reasons. News reports cited her resignation due to internal disputes over immigration policies. She also fought with National Security Council official Mauricio Claver-Carone over the administration's Venezuela policy.

In February 2020 Breier joined Covington & Burling as a Senior Adviser.

Personal life 
Kimberly Breier is married to Peter Breier, a senior associate at Booz Allen Hamilton.

References

Living people
1972 births
Walsh School of Foreign Service alumni
Middlebury College alumni
People from Marblehead, Massachusetts
United States Assistant Secretaries of State
21st-century American diplomats
American women ambassadors
Ambassadors of the United States
21st-century American women
American diplomats
American women diplomats